Llanbister Road railway station is a countryside stop about  from the village of Llanbister, Powys, Wales.

The unstaffed station is located at street level adjacent to the bridge beneath a minor road. All trains serving the station are operated by Transport for Wales.

Facilities
As with most others on the route, it has been fitted with a digital CIS display and customer help point in addition to the standard timetable poster board and waiting shelter. Part of the platform has been raised to allow travellers to board and alight from trains without the need for portable stairs, but no level access is available from the main entrance (the only entry and exit route is via a flight of 18 steps).

Its former station building still survives opposite the remaining active platform (as can be seen in the photo), though it is now a private residence.

Services
There are four trains a day in each direction (Shrewsbury eastbound and Llanelli westbound) from Monday to Saturday (plus a fifth service to Shrewsbury on Mon-Fri only), and two services on Sundays. This is a request stop, whereby passengers have to signal to the driver to board or alight from the train.

References

Further reading

External links 

Railway stations in Powys
DfT Category F2 stations
Former London and North Western Railway stations
Railway stations in Great Britain opened in 1865
Heart of Wales Line
Railway stations served by Transport for Wales Rail
Railway request stops in Great Britain